Donald Maclean (1800 – 21 March 1874) was a British barrister and member of parliament.

The son of Fitzroy Jeffreys Grafton Maclean, of Barbados, who later became Clan Chief of Clan Maclean and inherited a baronetcy, Maclean was educated at Eton and Balliol College, Oxford. In 1823 he was elected as the first President of the newly created Oxford Union, graduated BA in 1823, and was called to the bar from Lincoln's Inn in 1827. From 1835 to 1847 he was one of the two members of parliament for the City of Oxford constituency, and in 1844 was awarded the degree of Doctor of Civil Laws.

He was the younger brother of Sir Charles Maclean, 9th Baronet. In 1827 he married Harriet, daughter of General Frederick Maitland, and died in 1874.

Notes

1800 births
1874 deaths
Alumni of Balliol College, Oxford
People educated at Eton College
Members of the Parliament of the United Kingdom for English constituencies
Presidents of the Oxford Union
Younger sons of baronets
UK MPs 1835–1837
UK MPs 1837–1841
UK MPs 1841–1847
English barristers